Danciu may refer to:

Danciu River, a river of Romania

People with the surname
Ciprian Danciu (born 1977), Romanian footballer and manager

Romanian-language surnames